Ardhendu Kumar Dey (24 March 1938 – 27 July 2022) was an Indian politician and Minister of Irrigation and Soil Conservation in the Government of Assam. He was elected to the Assam Legislative Assembly from Hojai constituency from 1991 till 2006 as a member of INC. He was re-elected as an MLA from Hojai from 2011 to 2016. In April 2021, he joined the Bharatiya Janata Party.

Personal life
He was born on 24 March 1938 to Aswini Kumar Dey and Hemalata Dey. He was a resident of Hojai, Assam. In 1966, he married Maya Dey, with whom he had one son.

Death and reaction

Death
He was admitted into Gauhati Medical College and Hospital (GMCH) where he was undergoing treatment. On 27 July 2022, he passed away at the same hospital, aged 84.

His mortal remains were taken to his residence at Hojai where the last rites were performed.

Reaction
Many political figures and leaders including Chief Minister Himanta Biswa Sarma, Minister of Health & Family Welfare Keshab Mahanta, President of AIUDF Badruddin Ajmal, Sirajuddin Ajmal, President of Asom Gana Parishad Atul Bora, President of BJP Assam Bhabesh Kalita, President of Assam Pradesh Congress Committee Bhupen Kumar Borah, National General Secretary of Bharatiya Janata Party Dilip Saikia, Minister of Finance Ajanta Neog, Jayanta Malla Baruah, Pallab Lochan Das and many others expressed condolences at the demise of Dey.

In a statement, Chief Minister Himanta Biswa Sarma said:

References 

1938 births
2022 deaths
Assam Legislative Assembly
Bharatiya Janata Party politicians from Assam
Cotton College, Guwahati alumni
People from Karimganj district